Twisted Tales (also known as Tom Holland’s Twisted Tales) is a 2013 webseries that was written and directed by American director Tom Holland. The series was released in late 2013 through Fearnet's website and was released onto DVD on March 18, 2014 through Image Entertainment.

Holland had initially planned for Twisted Tales to have thirteen episodes, but had to cut four episodes because of budgetary and time constraints. He later released those in script format. He has stated that he is unsure as to whether or not he will continue the series, but that if he did he would prefer to make each episode at least 30 minutes in length.

Synopsis
Each episode begins with Tom Holland introducing the short and the basic plot of each episode, with the only exception being Vampire Dance, where Holland appears as a janitor and makes several comments as the episode progresses. The shorts are all self-contained and are unrelated to one another in any aspect other than Holland serving as the opening narrator.

Episodes

Reception
Critical reception for Twisted Tales has been mixed. Fangoria and Twitch Film both gave the DVD anthology mostly positive reviews and Twitch Film noted that "As with nearly every anthology series out there, there are high notes and low notes." We Got This Covered and Dread Central both expressed disappointment over the collection in comparison to Holland's previous work and Dread Central opined that the DVD collection would have been stronger if Holland had condensed the work and included only the stronger pieces, as the weaker shorts dragged the others down.

References

External links
 
 Twisted Tales shorts on Fearnet

American drama web series
Horror fiction web series
2013 web series debuts
Horror anthologies
Films directed by Tom Holland